The genus Trigoides is known from fossils from the Chengjiang Lagerstätte. It is proposed to be a type of ctenophore.

References

Prehistoric ctenophore genera